Kazincbarcikai SC is a Hungarian football club based in Kazincbarcika, Hungary. Playing in yellow and blue, the team's home is the Pete András Stadion.

Current squad
As of 5 August, 2022

 
Football clubs in Hungary
Association football clubs established in 1957
1957 establishments in Hungary